Bashinkhor Dogshin, Bashinkur Khan, Baishinkhur, also known as Bashinkur (Mongol: Башинхор Догшин) (born 11th century AD) was an Imperial Mongol Borjigid Ruler, he was the son and successor of Khaidu Khan, Bashinkhor was a great-great-great-grandson of Bodonchar Munkhag, who was Mongol warlord and a founder of Borjigin clan. Bashinkor was a grandfather of Khabul Khan who created the united Khamag Mongol Confederation. Upon his death, Bashinkor was immediately succeeded by his son Tumbinai Setsen.

References 

11th-century Mongolian people
Borjigin
12th-century Mongol rulers
12th-century Mongolian people
12th-century births
Tengrist monarchs